White Cliffs is a small town in outback New South Wales in Australia, in Central Darling Shire. White Cliffs is around 255 km northeast of Broken Hill, 93 km north of Wilcannia.

The primary school opened in 1895, and has operated continuously since then. White Cliffs was one of the many places visited by Bill Bryson in research for the book Down Under.

History

The town was established in the late 19th century when opal was discovered. Opal has been mined ever since. The first Australian opal was found 20 years before in Queensland in 1872, when a party of kangaroo hunters were operating in the White Cliffs area. One of them, who had left the party to track down a wounded kangaroo over some low stony hills, picked up a pretty stone which appealed to him. When taking back the stone, they suspected it could be opal which the local jeweller confirmed. He advised to get as much opal as possible since this could be more profitable than kangaroo hunting. When the group filed a claim, opal had not yet been listed under gemstones, and it was decided to file the claim under the "Gold Mining Act".

Inhabitants

Many of the residents live underground, using mining equipment to dig extensive homes in the hillside to avoid the intense heat outside. There are also two underground motels called The White Cliffs Underground and PJ's Bed And Breakfast, as the town is becoming more dependent on tourism.

Cricketer Bill O'Reilly was born in White Cliffs, the son of the first school teacher.

Industry
White Cliffs is the site of Australia's first solar power station. The White Cliffs Solar Power Station was built in 1981 producing 25 KWe and upgraded in 1996 to produce 45KWe using the same collector dishes but better technology.

Climate
White Cliffs has sweltering summers and pleasant winters.

References

External links
White Cliffs Primary School

Mining towns in New South Wales